This is a shortened version of the thirteenth chapter of the ICD-9: Diseases of the Musculoskeletal System and Connective Tissue. It covers ICD codes 710 to 739. The full chapter can be found on pages 395 to 415 of Volume 1, which contains all (sub)categories of the ICD-9. Volume 2 is an alphabetical index of Volume 1. Both volumes can be downloaded for free from the website of the World Health Organization.

Arthropathies and related disorders (710–719)
  Diffuse diseases of connective tissue
  Systemic lupus erythematosus
  Sjögren's syndrome
  Dermatomyositis
  Polymyositis
  Eosinophilia myalgia syndrome
  Connective tissue disease, unspec.
  Arthropathy associated with infections
  Crystal arthropathies
  Chondrocalcinosis due to dicalcium phosphate crystals
  Chondrocalcinosis due to pyrophosphate crystals
  Chondrocalcinosis, cause unspecified
 pseudogout
  Other specified crystal arthropathies
  Unspecified crystal arthropathy
  Arthropathy, endocrine disorders
  Arthropathy, gastrointestinal conditions
  Rheumatoid arthritis and other inflammatory polyarthropathies
  Rheumatoid arthritis
  Polyarticular juvenile rheumatoid arthritis
  Osteoarthrosis and allied disorders
  Osteoarthrosis, generalized, multiple sites
  Osteoarthrosis, shoulder
  Osteoarthrosis, hand
  Osteoarthrosis, hip
  Osteoarthrosis, knee
  Osteoarthrosis, ankle/foot
  Osteoarthrosis, unspec.
  Other and unspecified arthropathies
  Arthropathy, traumatic, unspec.
  Arthropathy, unspec.
  Internal derangement of knee
   Derangement of anterior horn of medial meniscus
  Derangement of lateral meniscus
  Chondromalacia of patella
  Derangement, internal, knee, unspec.
  Other derangement of joint
  Articular cartilage disorder
  Loose body in joint
  Pathological dislocation
  Recurrent dislocation of joint
  Contracture of joint
  Ankylosis of joint
  Unspecified intrapelvic protrusion of acetabulum
  Developmental dislocation of joint
  Other and unspecified disorders of joint
  Effusion/swelling of joint, unspec.
  Hemarthrosis
  Villonodular synovitis
  Palindromic rheumatism
  Joint pain, unspec.
  Stiffness of joint
  Difficulty in walking

Dorsopathies (720–724)
  Ankylosing spondylitis and other inflammatory spondylopathies
  Ankylosing spondylitis
  Spinal enthesopathy
  Sacroiliitis
  Spondylosis and allied disorders
  Cervical spondylosis w/o myelopathy
  Cervical spondylosis, w/myelopathy
  Thoracic spondylosis w/o myelopathy
  Lumbosacral spondylosis w/o myelopathy
  Thoracic or lumbar spondylosis w/ myelopathy
  Kissing spine
  Ankylosing vertebral hyperostosis
  Traumatic spondylopathy
  Intervertebral disc disorders
  Displacement cervical intervertebral disc
  Lumbar disc displacement w/o myelopathy
  Degeneration of intervertebral disc site unspecified
  Schmorl's nodes
  Degenerative disc disease, cervical
  Degeneration of thoracic or lumbar intervertebral disc
  Degenerative disc disease, thoracic
  Degenerative disc disease, lumbar
  Degeneration of intervertebral disc, site unspecified
 Degenerative disc disease
  Intervertebral disc disorder with myelopathy
  Postlaminectomy syndrome
  Other disorders of cervical region
  Spinal stenosis in cervical region
  Cervicalgia
  Cervicocranial syndrome
  Cervicobrachial syndrome (diffuse)
  Brachial neuritis or radiculitis nos
  Torticollis unspecified
  Panniculitis specified as affecting neck
  Ossification of posterior longitudinal ligament in cervical region
  Other and unspecified disorders of back
  Spinal stenosis, other than cervical
  Pain in thoracic spine
  Lumbago
  Sciatica
  Back pain w/ radiation, unspec.
  Backache, unspecified
  Disorders of sacrum
  Disorders of coccyx
  Coccygodynia
  Other symptoms referable to back

Rheumatism, excluding the back (725–729)
  Polymyalgia rheumatica
  Peripheral enthesopathies and allied syndromes
  Adhesive capsulitis, shoulder
  Rotator cuff syndrome, NOS (Not Otherwise Specified)
  Bicipital tenosynovitis
  Enthesopathy of elbow region
  Medial epicondylitis
  Lateral epicondylitis
  Olecranon bursitis
  Enthesopathy of wrist and carpus
  Enthesopathy of hip region
  Enthesopathy of knee
  Pes anserinus tendinitis
  Tendinitis, patellar
  Prepatellar bursitis
  Metatarsalgia, NOS (Not Otherwise Specified) 
  Tendinitis, achilles
  Tendinitis, tibialis
  Calcaneal spur
  Other disorders of synovium, tendon and bursa
  Synovitis and tenosynovitis
  Synovitis/tenosynovitis, unspec.
  Trigger finger, acquired
  de Quervain's disease
  Tenosynovitis, hand/wrist
  Tenosynovitis, foot/ankle
  Bunion
  Ganglion and cyst of synovium, tendon, and bursa
  Ganglion, tendon sheath
  Ganglion, unspec.
  Rupture of tendon, nontraumatic
  Rupture, biceps tendon
  Rupture, achilles tendon
  Other disorders of synovium, tendon, and bursa
  Plica syndrome
  Abscess, bursa
  Disorders of muscle, ligament, and fascia
  Infective myositis
  Muscular calcification and ossification
  Muscular wasting, atrophy
  Other specific muscle disorders
  Laxity of ligament
  Hypermobility syndrome
  Dupuytren's contracture
  Other fibromatoses
  Plantar fasciitis
  Other disorders of muscle, ligament, and fascia
  Diastasis recti
  Muscle spasm
  Necrotizing fasciitis
  Muscle weakness
  Rhabdomyolysis
  Iliotibial band syndrome
  Other disorders of soft tissues
  Rheumatism unspecified and fibrositis
  Myalgia and myositis, Fibromyositis
  Neuralgia neuritis and radiculitis unspecified
  Panniculitis unspecified
  Fasciitis unspecified
  Pain in limb
  Foreign body in soft tissue
  Nontraumatic compartment syndrome

Osteopathies, chondropathies, and acquired musculoskeletal deformities (730–739)
  Osteomyelitis, periostitis, and other infections involving bone
  Osteitis deformans and osteopathies associated with other disorders
  Osteochondropathies
  Osteochondritis dissecans
  Other disorders of bone and cartilage
  Osteoporosis
  Pathologic fracture
  Cyst of bone
  Hyperostosis of skull
  Aseptic necrosis of bone
  Osteitis condensans
  Tietze's disease
 Costochondritis
  Algoneurodystrophy
  Malunion and nonunion of fracture
  Other and unspecified disorders of bone and cartilage
   Disorder of bone and cartilage, unspecified
 Osteopenia
 Ostealgia
   Chondromalacia
  Flat foot
  Acquired deformities of toe
  Hallux valgus
  Hallux rigidus
  Hammer toe, other
  Other acquired deformities of limbs
  Mallet finger
  Other acquired deformities of finger
  Other acquired deformities of ankle and foot
  Acquired deformities of other parts of limbs
  Unequal leg length (acquired)
  Other acquired deformity of other parts of limb
 Winged scapula
  Acquired deformity, limb, unspec.
  Curvature of spine
  Kyphosis (acquired)
  Lordosis (acquired)
  Scoliosis
  Kyphosis/scoliosis, unspec.
  Other acquired deformity
  Acquired deformity of nose
  Other acquired deformity of head
  Acquired deformity of neck
  Acquired deformity of chest and rib
  Acquired spondylolisthesis
  Other acquired deformity of back or spine
  Acquired deformity of pelvis
  Cauliflower ear
  Acquired deformity of other specified site
  Acquired deformity of unspecified site
  Nonallopathic lesions, not elsewhere classified

International Classification of Diseases